The Coupe de France's results of the 1970–71 season. Stade Rennais won the final played on 20 June 1971, beating Olympique Lyonnais.

Round of 32

 *  - Joinville won 3-1 at penalty shootout

Round of 16

Quarter-finals

Semi-finals
First round

Second round

Final

References

French federation

1970–71 domestic association football cups
1970–71 in French football
1970-71